Ranthambore railway station is a small railway station in Sawai Madhopur district, Rajasthan. Its code is RNT.

The station consists of two platforms.  These platforms lack many facilities, including water and sanitation.

RNT is part of Kota railway division of West Central Railway zone, and has been classified under "D" category.

See also

 Ranthambore National Park
 Ranthambore Fort
 Sawai Madhopur Junction railway station
 Rajiv Gandhi Regional Museum of Natural History
 Shilpgram, Sawai Madhopur

References 

Sawai Madhopur
Kota railway division
Railway stations in Sawai Madhopur district